Niagara Falls or Golden Niagara Falls is a waterfall in Niagara Canyon, part of Niagara Creek in Goldstream Park near Langford, British Columbia, Canada. It drops  down a narrow gully.

References 

Waterfalls of British Columbia
Goldstream Land District